Sphingobacterium detergens is a Gram-negative bacterium from the genus of Sphingobacterium which has been isolated from soil. Sphingobacterium detergens produces surfactant.

References

External links
Type strain of Sphingobacterium detergens at BacDive -  the Bacterial Diversity Metadatabase

Sphingobacteriia
Bacteria described in 2012